The U.S. state of Tennessee first required its residents to register their motor vehicles in 1905. Registrants provided their own license plates for display until 1915, when the state began to issue plates.

, plates are issued by the Tennessee Department of Revenue through its Vehicle Services Division. Only rear plates have been required since 1977.

Passenger baseplates

1915 to 1961
The 1956 (dated 1957) issue was the first Tennessee license plate that complied with these standards, following a 21-year period where the plates were roughly the shape of the state of Tennessee.

No slogans were used on passenger plates during the period covered by this subsection.

1962 to present

County coding
From 1939 through 1965 and from 1971 through 1988, Tennessee license plates began with a one- or two-digit county code. The order of the codes was based on the respective populations of each county.

The codes remained constant from 1939 through 1965, then were re-allocated according to population shifts in 1971, 1976 and 1983.

Optional plates
Tennessee offers over 100 optional license plates. Most can be personalized for an additional fee.

Non-passenger plates

See also 
Tennessee Plates

References

External links
Tennessee license plates, 1969–present
Tennessee license plates 1915–1956

Tennessee
Transportation in Tennessee
Tennessee transportation-related lists